Encephalartos nubimontanus is a species of cycad which is native to Limpopo, South Africa.

Description
It is a cycad with an arborescent habit, with an erect or decumbent stem, up to 2.5 m tall and 35-40 cm in diameter, sometimes with secondary stems originating from basal suckers. The pinnate leaves, arranged in a crown at the apex of the stem, are 1–2 m long, supported by a stem about 23 cm long, which has a characteristic reddish ring at the base; they are composed of numerous pairs of lanceolate, leathery leaflets, up to 25 cm long, with a toothed margin and a pungent apex, arranged on the rachis at an angle of 70°.

It is a dioecious species, with male specimens presenting from 1 to 5 sub-conical, pedunculated, 25–40 cm long and 5–9 cm broad cones, and female specimens with 1-3 ovoid cones, 35–40 cm long and 18– wide 20 cm, light green color. The seeds are roughly ovoid, 3.5-3.8 cm long, covered with an orange-red sarcotesta.

References

External links
 
 

nubimontanus